Galactic Gladiators is a 1982 computer wargame published by Strategic Simulations for the Apple II and IBM PC.

Gameplay
Galactic Gladiators is a game in which the player fights against an alien opponent.

Reception
David Long reviewed the game for Computer Gaming World, and stated that "Easy to learn and fast to play, GG is a great starter game for "arcaders" who've never tried a "wargame" before. But, much like chess, it will take a long time to really feel like you've mastered this game (I sure haven't!) and the possibilities are endless."

Chris Smith reviewed SSI's RapidFire Line in The Space Gamer No. 59, and commented that "The game has two very strong points: secret movement and freshness."

Reviews
Computer Gaming World - Nov, 1992
Softline #2.2 (1982-11)

References

External links
Review in Softalk
1984 Software Encyclopedia from Electronic Games
Review in Electronic Games
Another review in Electronic Games
Review in Family Computing
Review in Micro (French)

1982 video games
Apple II games
Multiplayer video games
Science fiction video games
Strategic Simulations games
Turn-based strategy video games
Video games developed in the United States